Moscow has a warm-summer humid continental climate (Köppen climate classification Dfb) with warm to hot summers and long, cold, winters. Summer lasts from mid-May to the beginning of September, and winter lasts from the beginning of November to the end of March. Humidity is high year-round, although it is lowest during the spring months.

More extreme continental climates at the same latitude- such as parts of Eastern Canada or Siberia- have much colder winters than Moscow, suggesting that there is still significant moderation from the Atlantic Ocean despite the fact that Moscow is far from the sea.

Monthly averages and records for Moscow 
 
In 2007 three record highs for the month occurred – January , March , and May ; in 2008, there were new record highs for December and the entire winter: . On July 23, 2010, the temperature reached  and continued to set record highs each following day until it finally reached  on July 29, 2010. In November 2010 a new month record high of  occurred (after +12.6 in 1927).

Monthly precipitation totals are moderately high throughout the year, although precipitation levels tend to be higher during the summer than during the winter. Due to the significant variation in temperature between the winter and summer months as well as the limited fluctuation in precipitation levels during the summer, Moscow is considered to have a continental climate with no true dry season.

Most of records and averages are given for VVC weather station, located in the North-Eastern administrative okrug of Moscow. The temperature from this station averages 0.5–1 C° lower than in the city center, and 0.5–2 C° higher than night minimums in the suburbs.

Type of precipitation 

Most precipitation in Moscow falls as rain, but in winter months almost all precipitation falls as snow, forming firm snow cover. The last wet snow precipitation may be in the beginning of May, and it may restart at the end of September.

Snow cover 

Snow cover (averaging 5–7 months per year) forms at the end of October and melts by the start of April, although in recent years has not lasted as long as usual. For example, in the winter of 2006–2007 the snow cover didn't form until the end of January, and melted at the beginning of March; in 2007–2008, the snow cover melted at the end of February, and in the 2008–2009 winter, snow cover didn't form until the end of December, which is two months later than usual. Yet in 2011–2012 it melted in the middle of April.

Wind

Speed of wind 
The average wind speed is very high. In the city it is near 5 metres per second; in open places and airports it may top 6 metres per second.

Wind Storms and Tornadoes 
A few times per season, often in the May–September period during thunderstorms, wind speed may exceed 15–35 metres per second. The last powerful wind storm was in 1998, when wind speed was 30–35 metres per second. 157 persons were injured, 8 died, and 2157 buildings were damaged.

Tornadoes were recorded in 1904 and 1945 in Moscow and in 1970, 1971, the 1984 Yaroslavl tornado, 1987, 1994, and 1997 in Moscow Oblast 100 km south-east from Moscow (near Zaraysk), in 2005 in Dubna, and on 3 August 2007 in Krasnogorsk.

In the 3 June 2009 tornado, F3 registered near Sergiyev Posad, Moscow oblast.

Сloudiness and day light

Number of clear, cloudy and overcast days 
On average Moscow has 1731 hours of sunshine in a year. In 2004–2008, near 1800–2000 hours.

Daylight, average number of hours/day 
Duration of daylight depends on geographical position of Moscow. It varies from 7 hours 00 minutes on December 22 to 17 hours 34 minutes on June 22. The maximum height of the sun above the horizon is 11° on 22 December and 58° on 22 June.

Near the day of the summer solstice (June 22), the sun does not fall below −12°, thus the nautical twilight occurs throughout this period. Nevertheless, lighting of the navigational twilight is not enough for normal human activity, so the streets need artificial illumination, and it is believed that there are no so-called white nights in Moscow, although the sky remains dark blue, and not black, as, for example, in southern Russia.

See also

VVC weather station
Climate of Russia
1904 Moscow tornado
1984 Soviet Union tornado outbreak
2009 Krasnozavodsk tornado

References 
 Calculator (The average air temperature, air rate and deviations from it)

Moscow
Geography of Moscow
Moscow